The 2012–13 season is the 92nd season of competitive football for Rochdale A.F.C., a professional English football club based in Rochdale, Greater Manchester. Rochdale return to Football League Two for 2012–13 following a two-season stint in League One which ended with a last-place finish in 2011–12. Rochdale began their 2012–13 Football League Two season with a 0–0 draw with Northampton. They entered into three cup competitions in the first round due to the league table they are in. John Coleman's and Jimmy Bell's contracts were terminated by Rochdale on 21 January 2013 following a poor run in form.

Squad

Statistics

																								

|}

Friendlies

Last updated: 12 June 2013

Football League Two

League table

Fixtures

Last updated: 11 June 2016

FA Cup

Football League Cup

Football League Trophy

References

Rochdale A.F.C. seasons
Rochdale